The 2006 Mercedes Cup was the 2006 edition of the Mercedes Cup tennis tournament. The tournament was held from 17 until 23 July 2006 at the Tennis Club Weissenhof in Stuttgart, Germany. David Ferrer won his first title of the year, and second of his career.

Finals

Singles

 David Ferrer defeated  José Acasuso, 6–4, 3–6, 6–7(3–7), 7–5, 6–4

Doubles

 Gastón Gaudio /  Max Mirnyi defeated  Yves Allegro /  Robert Lindstedt 7–5, 6–7(4–7), [12–10]

References

External links
 Official website 
 ATP tournament profile
 ITF tournament edition details
 Singles draw
 Doubles draw

Stuttgart Open
Stuttgart Open
2006 in German tennis